Friday is a 2023 Bengali thriller web series directed by Raihan Rafi. It starring Toma Mirza and Nasir Uddin Khan in the lead roles.

Cast 

 Toma Mirza
 Nasir Uddin Khan

Release 
The series was released on 3 March 2023.

Controversy 
The series's poster was found to be plagiarised from  Parasite and House of Secrets: The Burari Deaths.

References 

Bangladeshi web series
Crime television series
Murder in television
2023 web series debuts
Bangladeshi crime drama television series
Streaming television in Bangladesh